These are the official results of the athletics competition at the 2011 Southeast Asian Games which was held from 12 to 16 November 2011 in Palembang, Indonesia.

Men's events

Track

100 metres 
Records

Round 1
Qualification rule: The first there finishers in each heat (Q) plus the two fastest times of those who finished four or lower in their heat (q) qualified.

Heat 1 
November 12, 09:00
 Wind: -0.8 m/s

Heat 2 
November 12, 09:05

FINAL
November 12, 18:30
 Wind: +2.1 m/s

200 metres 
Records

Round 1
Qualification rule: The first there finishers in each heat (Q) plus the two fastest times of those who finished four or lower in their heat (q) qualified.

Heat 1 
November 14, 07:30
 Wind: -1.4 m/s

Heat 2 
November 14, 07:35
 Wind: -1.4 m/s

FINAL
November 14, 18:40
 Wind: +1.7 m/s

400 metres 
Records

Round 1
Qualification rule: The first there finishers in each heat (Q) plus the two fastest times of those who finished four or lower in their heat (q) qualified.

Heat 1 
November 12, 20:05

Heat 2 
November 12, 20:10

FINAL
November 13, 19:30

800 m 

November 15, 18:45

1500 m 

        
November 13, 20:00
  	  
 Malaysia's Mohd Jironi Riduan finished third in the 1500 m but was disqualified for pulling on another athlete's shirt.

5000 m 

November 15, 18:00

10000 m 

November 13, 18:00

110 m hurdles 
Records

Round 1
Qualification rule: The first there finishers in each heat (Q) plus the two fastest times of those who finished four or lower in their heat (q) qualified.

Heat 1 
November 13, 08:45

Heat 2 
November 13, 08:50

FINAL
November 13, 18:45
 Wind: +0.7 m/s

400 m hurdles 
Records

Round 1
Qualification rule: The first there finishers in each heat (Q) plus the two fastest times of those who finished four or lower in their heat (q) qualified.

Heat 1 
November 14, 18:00

Heat 2 
November 14, 08:05

FINAL
November 15, 17:30

3000 metre Steeplechase 
Records

November 12, 19.35
FINAL

4x100 metres 
Records

November 15, 19:20

4x400 metres 
Records

November 14, 20:00

Field events

High jump 
Records

November 14, 18:00

Pole vault 
November 12 - FINAL
FINAL

Discus throw 
Records

November 12, 08.30
FINAL

Women's events

Track events

100 metres 
Records

FINAL 
November 12, 18:15
 Wind: +1.7 m/s

200 metres 
Records

Round 1
Qualification rule: The first there finishers in each heat (Q) plus the two fastest times of those who finished four or lower in their heat (q) qualified.

Heat 1 
November 14, 08:00

Heat 2 
November 14, 08:05

FINAL
November 14, 18:40
 Wind: +1.4 m/s

400 metres 
Records

Round 1
Qualification rule: The first there finishers in each heat (Q) plus the two fastest times of those who finished four or lower in their heat (q) qualified.

Heat 1 
November 12, 19:50

Heat 2 
November 12, 19:55

FINAL
November 13, 19:15

800 metres 
Records

November 15, 18:30

1500 metres 
Records

November 13, 20:15

5000 metres 
Records

November 14, 18:20

10000 metres 
Records

November 12, 17:30

100 m hurdles 
Records

Round 1
Qualification rule: The first there finishers in each heat (Q) plus the two fastest times of those who finished four or lower in their heat (q) qualified.

Heat 1 
November 13, 09:00

Heat 2 
November 13, 09:05

FINAL
November 13, 19:00

400 m hurdles 
Records

November 15, 17:45

3000 metre steeplechase 
Records

November 12–19.15
FINAL

4x100 metres 
Records

November 15, 19:40

4x400 metres 
Records

November 14, 19:40

Marathon 
Records

November 16, 05:30

20 km walk 
Records

November 13, 06:00

Field events

High jump 
Records

November 13, 18.00

Pole vault 
Records

November 15, 17.30

Long jump 
Records

Triple jump 
Records

November 14, 19.30

Shot put 
Records

November 14, 19.20

Discus throw 
Records

November 15, 18.30

Hammer throw 
Records

November 12, 17.00

Javelin throw 
Records

November 13, 18.00

Heptathlon 
Records

100 m hurdles
November 14, 07:00

High Jump
November 14, 08:30

Shot Put
November 14, 18:00

200 metres
November 14, 19:20
Wind: 1.2 m/s

Long jump
November 15, 16:00

Javelin throw
November 15, 17:30

800 metres
November 15, 19:00

OVERALL RESULTS
The final results of the event are in the following table.

References

Athletics results
Southeast Asian Games
2011 results